West Riding of Yorkshire was a parliamentary constituency in England from 1832 to 1865. It returned two Members of Parliament (MPs) to the House of Commons of the Parliament of the United Kingdom.

Boundaries and History
This constituency comprised part of Yorkshire, the largest of the ancient counties of England. Between 1826 and 1832 the undivided county constituency had returned four Members of Parliament to the House of Commons, instead of the traditional two knights of the shire which the county had sent before then and all other English counties elected up until 1832.

The Reform Act 1832 divided Yorkshire into three county constituencies, which each returned two members. The divisions were based on the three ridings, which were traditional sub-divisions of Yorkshire.  The West Riding occupied the south western part of the county. The parliamentary constituency covered the whole West Riding, as the non-resident owners of forty shilling freeholds in the Parliamentary boroughs enclaved within the area thereby acquired a county franchise.

The polling place for the West Riding, at which the hustings were held and the result was declared, was at Wakefield. Unusually for British elections detailed results by polling district are available for a by-election in 1835 and the general elections of 1837 and  1841. These details are given in the Elections section below and provide a list of major towns in the area. Electors had to declare their votes (verbally and in public), as this was before the introduction of the secret ballot. (Source: Stooks Smith).

Charles Seymour, in Electoral Reform in England and Wales, commented about the debate in 1832 about the non resident freeholder vote. This was a particularly important issue for the West Riding because the major towns of Bradford, Leeds and Sheffield and the important ones of Halifax, Huddersfield and Wakefield were all to become new Parliamentary boroughs in 1832.

Though the general principle of the freeholder franchise was accepted without debate, one aspect of the question gave rise to much discussion at the time ... . The bill provided that the freeholders in boroughs who did not occupy their property should vote in the counties in which the borough was situated. This clause drew forth a torrent of complaint, especially from the Conservatives. Peel pointed out that it would be far simpler for the freeholders in the represented boroughs to vote in the borough where their property was situate instead of being forced to travel to the county polling place; moreover if the borough freeholders were allowed to vote in the counties he felt that the boroughs would have an unfair influence in county elections and the rural element would be submerged by the urban.

... Althorp ... pointed out that until 1832 freeholders in the unrepresented towns always had voted in the counties, so the Tories could hardly complain that the ministers were introducing new principles to favour urban interests ... .

Stooks Smith confirms the number of electors in the polling districts of the West Riding of Yorkshire constituency named after Parliamentary boroughs, at a by-election in 1835 (see below), which suggests up to two-thirds out of a total electorate of 18,063 might have qualified because of freeholds located in boroughs. However it is not known if all these urban area voters were qualified as non-resident freeholders in the boroughs.

The Parliamentary boroughs in the area, during the period of the existence of this constituency, were Bradford, Halifax, Huddersfield, Knaresborough, Leeds, Pontefract, Ripon, Sheffield and Wakefield.

For the 1865 general election the West Riding was split into two new two member county divisions by the Birkenhead Enfranchisement Act 1861. Unusually this local redistribution had taken place between the general redistributions of seats, in 1832 and 1868. This was because some seats, taken from Sudbury and St Albans boroughs disenfranchised for corruption, were re-allocated to what (by the developing idea that representation should be related to population) were the still under-represented northern English counties. The new divisions were Northern West Riding of Yorkshire and Southern West Riding of Yorkshire.

Members of Parliament

MPs 1654–1658 (Protectorate Parliament)

MPs 1832–1865

Elections
Where the exact number of electors casting a vote or votes is unknown, turnout estimated by dividing votes cast by 2. This will underestimate turnout to the extent that electors only used one of their two possible votes.

Elections in the 1830s

Constituency created (1832)

 Appointment of Howard as Chief Secretary to the Lord Lieutenant of Ireland
 

Breakdown of vote by polling district

 Note (1835 be): Discrepancy of 2 in reg. between Craig (result) and Stooks Smith (breakdown).

Elections in the 1840s

 Note (1837): 25,273 voted. George Julian Harney and Lawrence Pitkethley were nominated on the Chartist interest, but did not obtain any votes. (Source: Stooks Smith).
 Succession of Stuart-Wortley as 2nd Baron Wharncliffe, 19 December 1845

 Appointment of Howard as First Commissioner of Woods, Forests, Land Revenues, Works, and Buildings

 Succession of Howard as 7th Earl of Carlisle, 7 October 1848

Elections in the 1850s

Robinson succeeded to the peerage, becoming 2nd Earl of Ripon and causing a by-election.

 

{{Election box turnout|
 |votes = 29,326 (est)
 |percentage = 80.0 (est)
 |change = N/A
}}

 
 Constituency abolished 1865References

 British Parliamentary Election Results 1832-1885, compiled and edited by F.W.S. Craig (Macmillan Press 1977)
 Electoral Reform in England and Wales, by Charles Seymour (David & Charles Reprints 1970) originally published in 1915, so out of copyright The Parliaments of England by Henry Stooks Smith (1st edition published in three volumes 1844–50), second edition edited (in one volume) by F.W.S. Craig (Political Reference Publications 1973) originally published in 1844-50, so out of copyright Who's Who of British Members of Parliament: Volume I 1832-1885'', edited by M. Stenton (The Harvester Press 1976)
 

Parliamentary constituencies in Yorkshire and the Humber (historic)
Constituencies of the Parliament of the United Kingdom established in 1832
Constituencies of the Parliament of the United Kingdom disestablished in 1865
West Riding of Yorkshire